Calodesma plorator is a moth of the family Erebidae. It was described by William James Kaye in 1922. It is found on Trinidad off the northeastern coast of Venezuela.

References

Calodesma
Moths described in 1922